The 2012 Major League Baseball First-Year Player Draft was held from June 4 through June 6, 2012, from Studio 42 of the MLB Network in Secaucus, New Jersey. The Houston Astros, with the first overall pick, selected Carlos Correa from the Puerto Rico Baseball Academy and High School.

Draft order
The draft order was determined by the 2011 Major League Baseball season standings. With the worst record in 2011, the Houston Astros received the first pick.

Also, teams can lose draft picks for signing certain free agents, while teams losing free agents will receive draft picks as compensation. The Elias Sports Bureau ranks all players based on performance over the past two seasons, with the top 20% being considered "Type A" and the next 20% considered "Type B". If a team offers a Type A free agent arbitration and he signs with another club, the player's former team obtains the new team's first- or second-round pick, depending on whether the new team is in the top 15 or bottom 15 in won-loss records in 2011, as well as a supplemental pick after the first round. If a team offers a Type B free agent arbitration and he signs with another club, the former team gets a supplemental pick after the first round. 

The new Collective Bargaining Agreement between MLB and the MLBPA announced on November 22, modified the compensation required for certain Type A players. Six Type A players became modified Type A free agents, meaning a team signing one of them was not required to forfeit a draft pick, but the team losing them will receive a draft pick in the slot immediately before the pick they would have received had the player actually had Type A status. Five further Type A players became modified Type B free agents, with compensation equivalent to other Type B free agents.

First round

Supplemental first round

Compensation picks

Other notable selections

See also

List of first overall Major League Baseball draft picks

References

External links
Major League Baseball Draft Official Site
2012 Major League Baseball Draft at ESPN

Major League Baseball draft
Draft
Major League Baseball draft
Major League Baseball draft
Baseball in New Jersey
Events in New Jersey
Sports in Hudson County, New Jersey
Secaucus, New Jersey